Rino may refer to:

 Rino (given name)
 Republican In Name Only, a pejorative term for U.S. Republicans considered to be insufficiently conservative
 Rino, a singer-songwriter who performs under CooRie
 RiNo, the River North Art District north of Downtown Denver

See also
 Rhino (disambiguation)
 Ryno (disambiguation)